Arthur Davidson (30 November 1912 – 14 December 2002) was an Australian rules footballer who played for the Hawthorn Football Club in the Victorian Football League (VFL).

Davidson was from Sale originally. Davidson won Sale’s 1933 club best and fairest gold medal award.  Davidson won the 1935 Gippsland Football League's best and fairest award, the Trood Award prior to joining his older brother Hec Davidson at Camberwell in 1936. 

His statistics at Camberwell FC were – 47 games and 96 goals, (1936–38). Camberwell best and fairest 1938.

Notes

External links 

1912 births
2002 deaths
Australian rules footballers from Victoria (Australia)
Hawthorn Football Club players
Camberwell Football Club players